(Geoffrey) Lionel Berry, 2nd Viscount Kemsley (29 June 1909 – 28 February 1999), was a British Conservative politician, peer and newspaper editor.

Biography
Berry was born in Hendon. His father was Gomer Berry, 1st Viscount Kemsley (1883–1968), a prominent newspaper baron, owner of titles including The Sunday Times and the Daily Record.

Berry served in the Grenadier Guards during World War II until he was invalided in 1942. The following year 1943, in a wartime by-election on 4 April, he was elected unopposed as Member of Parliament (MP) for Buckingham. However, he lost his seat to Labour at the 1945 general election.

Berry was managing editor of the Daily Sketch and later Deputy Chairman of Kemsley Newspapers Limited. He succeeded as Viscount Kemsley upon his father's death in 1968. By then, his father's newspaper business had been sold off and Berry played no further part in it.

Marriage and family
Berry married Lady Helene Candida Hay (born 5 September 1913, died 4 January 2011), eldest daughter of William George Montagu Hay, 11th Marquess of Tweeddale, on 21 June 1933.

They had four daughters:

 Hon Mary Anne Berry (born 30 April 1934)
 Hon Pamela Jane Marguerite Berry (born 27 May 1937, died 13 December 2013)
 Hon Caroline Helen Berry (born 8 September 1942)
 Hon Catherine Frances Lilian Berry (born 9 June 1944)

Berry died aged 89 in 1999 in Harborough, Leicestershire, and was succeeded in the viscountcy by his nephew, Richard Gomer Berry.

References

External links 
 

Kemsley, Lionel Berry, 2nd Viscount
Kemsley, Lionel Berry, 2nd Viscount
British Army personnel of World War II
Conservative Party (UK) MPs for English constituencies
Grenadier Guards officers
UK MPs 1935–1945
Kemsley, Lionel Berry, 2nd Viscount
Kemsley, Lionel Berry, 2nd Viscount
People from Hendon
Kemsley, Lionel Barry, 2nd Viscount
Lionel Berry